Dolina pri Lendavi is a settlement southeast of Lendava in the Prekmurje region of Slovenia. It lies close to the border with Hungary.

Name
The name of the settlement was changed from Dolina to Dolina pri Lendavi in 1953.

References

External links
Dolina pri Lendavi on Geopedia

Populated places in the Municipality of Lendava